Sahazalalpur is a village in English Bazar Block of Malda district in the state of West Bengal, India. The village is where Kotwali Bhavan (the house of Indian National Congress leader and former Railways Minister A.B.A. Ghani Khan Choudhury) is located.

Geography
The nearest railway station is Malda Town which is 6 km away. The district headquarters is located 7 km away in English Bazar.

History
The Sahazalalpur village is the residence of notable people A.B.A. Ghani Khan Choudhury who served as the Minister of Railways in Indira Gandhi's and Rajiv Gandhi's governments and his niece Mausam Noor who served as the Member of Lok Sabha for Maldaha Uttar from 2009 until 2019.

References 

Villages in Malda district